The men's team round event was part of the archery programme at the 1904 Summer Olympics. The competition was held on 21 September 1904 at Francis Field. 16 archers (from the host United States), comprising 4 teams of 4, competed. The event was won by the Potomac Archers (based in Washington, D.C.), with the Cincinnati Archers taking silver, the Boston Archers bronze, and the Chicago Archers fourth place.

Background
This was the first appearance of a men's team event; team events would not return again until 1988 (though in a different format). The 1904 Olympic archery events were part of the 26th Grand Annual Target Meeting of the National Archery Association, with competition open to international competitors though none actually competed. It was thus largely an American national championship, though the International Olympic Committee recognizes the winners as Olympic medalists.

The Boston Archers included George Bryant, while the Potomac Archers included Robert Williams and William Thompson; the three men had each won two medals in the individual events earlier on the two prior days (Bryant both gold, Williams both silver, and Thompson both bronze).

Competition format
The competition featured four-man teams, with each archer shooting 96 arrows at 60 yards. The total for the team was thus 384 arrows. All four individual scores were summed to give a team score.

Schedule 
The team events—both men and women—were held on the third day of the three-day archery tournament.

Results
George Bryant, the winner of the two individual events, was again the best individual archer in this competition, scoring 443. However, there was a significant drop-off between him and the next archer on his Boston team, his brother Wallace (who scored 296). The other two individual medalists, Thompson and Williams, both had solid rounds of 413 and 386 to lead the Potomac Archers to a narrow victory over the Cincinnati Archers, led by Woodruff's 429.

References

External links
 International Olympic Committee medal winners database
 De Wael, Herman. Herman's Full Olympians: "Archery 1904".

Men's team round
Men's events at the 1904 Summer Olympics